Bir Mourad Raïs is a district in Algiers Province, Algeria. It was named after its capital, Bir Mourad Raïs.

Municipalities
The district is further divided into 5 municipalities:
Bir Mourad Raïs
Hydra 
Saoula 
Birkhadem
Gué de Constantine

Notable people

Districts of Algiers Province